Jeffrey Paul Blockley (born 12 September 1949) is an English former footballer who played as a defender. He made over 300 Football League appearances, and was capped by the England national football team.

Blockley was born in Leicester but began his career with Coventry City, making his debut for them in 1968–69. A central defender, he played nearly 150 league matches for Coventry and was capped by the England U23 side. In October 1972 he was snapped up by Arsenal for a fee of £200,000, as the intended replacement for former captain Frank McLintock. He made his debut for Arsenal in a 1–0 loss to Sheffield United on 7 October 1972, and four days later made his full England debut, against Yugoslavia, which finished 1-1.

Towards the end of his first season, and playing despite an injury, Blockley's uncertainty in the FA Cup semi-final against Sunderland contributed to Arsenal's defeat, and his relationship with the supporters never really recovered. However, with Frank McLintock leaving Arsenal in the summer of 1973 Blockley became first choice centre back, and early in the 1973-74 season he scored his only league goal for the Gunners, versus Leeds United. However the season was to turn out to be a difficult one for both Blockley and Arsenal, with defeats in both domestic cup competitions to lower-level sides.

Many of the club's fans laid the blame at Blockley's feet (Nick Hornby recounts in his memoir Fever Pitch that Blockley was "an incompetent to rival Ian Ure"); Bertie Mee would later reflect that signing Blockley was the worst mistake he ever made as Arsenal manager. Blockley's days at Arsenal were numbered – though he was still at Arsenal at the start of the 1974–75 season, he was dropped, and placed on the transfer list. In January 1975 Blockley was sold to Leicester City for £100,000. In all he played 62 matches for the Gunners, scoring one goal. His England cap against Yugoslavia proved to be his only one.

At Leicester, Blockley had somewhat of a mini-renaissance, helping rescue the side from relegation that season, helping them finish seventh in 1975–76, and eventually becoming club captain. Blockley struggled with injuries throughout the 1977-78 season, which contributed significantly to Leicester's ultimate relegation. After 76 league matches in three and a half seasons and a brief loan to Derby County where he played one game, he left in 1978 for Notts County. Blockley made 59 league appearances for the Nottingham-based club, before leaving the club at the end of the 1979-80 season to join Enderby Town. He went on to join Gloucester City for the 1981-82 season, playing 15 times.

After retiring, Blockley did not opt for a career in coaching or management and instead became a salesman for a power transmission company. He now owns his own business, Transmech.

References

External links
 League appearances/goals breakdown by season, and December 1976 photo – football heroes

1949 births
Living people
English footballers
Association football central defenders
England international footballers
England under-23 international footballers
English Football League players
Coventry City F.C. players
Arsenal F.C. players
Leicester City F.C. players
Gloucester City A.F.C. players
Notts County F.C. players
Leicester United F.C. players
English Football League representative players